HMCS Qu'Appelle can refer to several different things named after the Qu'Appelle River in Saskatchewan:

  (I), a River-class destroyer that served in the Royal Canadian Navy during the Second World War, commissioned February 1944 until May 1946.
  (II), a  escort that served in the RCN and the Canadian Forces during the Cold War, commissioned February 1963.
 CSTC HMCS Qu'Appelle (III), a Cadet Summer Training Centre operated by the Royal Canadian Sea Cadets from 1993 to 2004.

Battle honours
Atlantic, 1944.
Normandy, 1944.
Biscay, 1944.

References

 Government of Canada Ships' Histories - HMCS Qu'Appelle

Royal Canadian Navy ship names